Paykend or Poykent, an ancient city in Uzbekistan, is located in the lower stream of Zarafshan River and was one of the largest cities of the Bukhara oasis. The city consisted of a citadel, two settlements, and a rabod (suburb). Paykend is currently under consideration for inscription as a UNESCO World Heritage site.

Site description

According to the archaeological research, Poykent was founded as a small village in the 4th century B.C., and was later transformed into a fortress. During that period, it was a trade center, as the city connected Southern countries (Bactria, India, Iran) with Northern countries (Front of Ural, Coast of Volga, Northern Caucus). Poykent was one of the important military and trade centers of the Western borders of the Sogd. Due to the development of the Great Silk Road and joining with Poykent fortress have been founded first and second sites of ancient settlement. Hence the city Poykent was founded.

According to Chinese chronicles, this city was under the "An" (安, Bukhara) kingdom and was the centre of the "Bi" (毕) khanate. It has also been noted that in Poykent there was no khokim (governor), the city was ruled by traders' council, and in the full sense of the word the city was a republic in the 6th-7th century. The scientists of Institute of Archaeology of the Academy of Sciences of the Republic of Uzbekistan have carried out scientific research in the ruins of the city for a long time. As a result, Zoroastrian temples, a palace, and a mosque, built in the 9th century, and remnants of a tower were found in citadel. In the inner part of city were discovered defensive walls, a gate, roads, and the remains of [living] quarters (makhallas), while on the outside rabads (suburbs) of the city - there are pottery centers and caravanserais. According to the researcher, due to the inaccessibility of the lower flaw of Zarafshon River, the city ceased to exist in the middle of the 9th century.

History

World Heritage Status
This site was added to the UNESCO World Heritage Tentative List on 18 January 2008, in the Cultural category.

Notes
2. https://journals.openedition.org/asiecentrale/pdf/1841

References
https://journals.openedition.org/asiecentrale/pdf/1841

Archaeological sites in Uzbekistan
Populated places in Uzbekistan
World Heritage Tentative List